Roots of Reform Judaism is an advocacy group within the constituency of the American Union for Reform Judaism. The group's primary focus is a return to the values and worship style of the "Classical Reform" era. This includes the belief that the universal message of Judaism is as a purely religious community, the importance of belief and ethics, decorum and less practical observance. Rabbi Howard A. Bergman is the current executive director for the society.

The Society has a broad program of outreach to rabbis, congregations, individuals and the national institutions of the Reform Movement. Educational forums, special services and sermons, and member gatherings throughout the United States foster the Classical Reform tradition as the shared heritage of all Reform Jews, as well as a vital alternative in the midst of the Movement's broad diversity today. In 2009-10, these programs included major presentations at the Biennial Convention on the Union for Reform Judaism, seminars and symposiums at the Hebrew Union College-Jewish Institute of Religion, and participation in meetings of groups representing the Central Conference of American Rabbis and the American Conference of Cantors. In addition, many major congregations sponsor programs and sermons on the work of the SCRJ to introduce local Jewish communities to this resource.

The Society publishes a quarterly newsletter/journal, The Reform Advocate. It produces other educational and liturgical materials such as compact disc recordings featuring worship services from the historic Reform liturgy, The Union Prayer Book in its recently revised edition, accompanied by selections of the historical and contemporary choral repertoire.

The Society has a national Board of Trustees numbering 25 lay and rabbinic leaders, a Rabbinic Advisory Board numbering over 60 rabbis, an active Music Commission, including cantors, Jewish musicians and composers, and supporting contributors from every state and many foreign countries.

References

2. “Reform is Too Frum For Us, Say Members.” The JC, 2009. https://www.thejc.com/news/world/reform-is-too-frum-for-us-say-members-1.13101

Sources
Society's website
17 Mar. 2008, Kansas City Jewish Chronicle article
article on the Society

 Classical Reform Judaism
 Union for Reform Judaism
 Reform Judaism in the United States
 Jewish religious organizations
 Jewish organizations based in the United States
 Jewish organizations established in the 2000s
 Religious organizations established in 2008